Hans Normann Dahl (7 October 1937 – 29 January 2019) was a Norwegian illustrator, painter and sculptor.

Dahl was educated at the Norwegian National Academy of Craft and Art Industry from 1952 to 1957 and the Academy of Fine Arts in Warsaw from 1965 to 1966. Dahl made his debut at the Autumn Exhibition at Oslo in 1957.
He delivered illustrations the newspaper Dagbladet from 1967 to 1988.  He also illustrated a number of books including Snekker Andersen og Julenissen  by Alf Prøysen (Schoenhofsforeign Books. 1971).

He is represented at the National Museum of Art, Architecture and Design, at Bergen Museum and at the National Gallery in Warsaw. He received the Cappelen Prize in 1981, shared with Vivian Zahl Olsen.

References

1937 births
2019 deaths
People from Lørenskog
20th-century Norwegian painters
21st-century Norwegian painters
Norwegian male painters
Norwegian illustrators
Norwegian caricaturists
20th-century Norwegian male artists
21st-century Norwegian male artists